Jim Pope (2 October 1933 – 18 August 2001) was an English radio and television continuity announcer and voice over artist. He began his career in radio and moved to TV to deliver continuity links for HTV in the 1960s and early 1970s.

Pope later moved to Granada TV where he devoted his career as a continuity announcer and newsreader of Granada Reports bulletins. His most well known contemporaries were Charles Foster and Colin Weston. While working primarily as a continuity announcer, he also voiced Granada-produced trails and promos for the ITV network and was a narrator for the highly regarded current affairs programme, World in Action.

Pope was also known for providing the voice-over announcements for Granada's University Challenge. He performed this service in the original Bamber Gascoigne hosted show and resumed the role in the revived Jeremy Paxman hosted version from 1994.

Pope also had a cameo role as an interviewer on Alan Bleasdale's Channel 4 series GBH.

1933 births
2001 deaths
Radio and television announcers
Game show announcers